Richard Griffin, 2nd Baron Braybrooke (3 July 1750 – 28 February 1825) was an English politician and peer. He was known as Richard Aldworth-Neville or Richard Aldworth Griffin-Neville to 1797.

Early life

Aldworth was born on 3 July 1750 in Duke Street, Westminster. He was the only son and heir of Richard Neville Aldworth Neville and the former Magdalen Calandrini. His only sibling was sister Frances, who became the wife of Francis Jalabert.

His maternal grandfather was Francis Calandrini, first syndic (or civil magistrate) of Geneva. His paternal grandparents were Richard Aldworth of Stanlake, and the former Catherine Neville (a daughter of Richard Neville of Billingbear House). His father assumed the name and arms of Neville in August 1762, when, on the death of the Countess of Portsmouth (widow of his maternal uncle Henry Neville Grey before her marriage to John Wallop, 1st Earl of Portsmouth), he succeeded to the estate of Billingbear. 

He matriculated at Merton College, Oxford, on 20 June 1768, was created M.A. 4 July 1771, D.C.L. 3 July 1810, and was incorporated LL.D. of Cambridge in 1819.

Career

Neville served as a Lieutenant in the Berkshire Militia in 1779.

On the death, in May 1797, of his father's maternal uncle John Griffin, 4th Baron Howard de Walden, by whom he had been adopted as heir, Griffin-Neville succeeded to the Braybrooke barony. He assumed the additional surname and arms of Griffin, and came into possession of the Audley End estate until the death in 1802 of Dr. Parker, son-in-law of the late Baron, who had a life interest in it. Braybrooke increased the property by the purchase of neighbouring manors and farms from the Earls of Bristol and Suffolk, and other acquisitions.

He became Lord Lieutenant of Essex and custos rotulorum of the county immediately after his accession to the peerage (19 January 1798), and was also vice-admiral of Essex, recorder of Saffron Walden, high steward of Wokingham, hereditary visitor of Magdalene College, Cambridge, and provost marshal of Jamaica.

Personal life
On 19 June 1780 Aldworth-Neville married Catherine Grenville at Stowe, Buckinghamshire. Catherine was the youngest daughter of Prime Minister George Grenville and the former Elizabeth Wyndham (daughter of Sir William Wyndham, 3rd Baronet and sister of Charles Wyndham, 2nd Earl of Egremont). Together, they were the parents of six sons (including twins who died immediately after birth) and four daughters:

 Richard Griffin, 3rd Baron Braybrooke (1783–1858), who married Lady Jane Cornwallis, eldest daughter of Charles Cornwallis, 2nd Marquess Cornwallis and Lady Louisa Gordon (fourth daughter of Alexander Gordon, 4th Duke of Gordon) in 1819.
 Hon. Henry Neville-Grenville (d. 1809), a Captain in the dragoons who died while serving in Spain after the Battle of Talavera.
 Hon. George Neville-Grenville (1789–1854), Dean of Windsor and Chaplain-in-Ordinary to Queen Victoria; he married his second half-cousin once removed, Lady Charlotte Legge, second daughter of George Legge, 3rd Earl of Dartmouth and Lady Frances Finch (second daughter of Heneage Finch, 3rd Earl of Aylesford) in 1816.
 William Neville-Grenville, who died young.
 Hon. Catherine Neville-Grenville (d. 1841), who died unmarried. 
 Hon. Mary Neville-Grenville, who married Sir Stephen Glynne, 8th Baronet, of Hawarden.
 Hon. Caroline Neville-Grenville (d. 1868), who married Paul Thompson, 1st Baron Wenlock in 1817.
 Hon. Frances Neville-Grenville, who died young.

Lord Braybrooke died on 28 February 1825, after a lingering illness, at his seat at Billingbear House, and was buried at Laurence Waltham. He was succeeded in the barony by his eldest surviving son, Richard.

References

Attribution

1750 births
1825 deaths
Royal Berkshire Militia officers
Lord-Lieutenants of Essex
Aldworth Neville, Richard
Aldworth Neville, Richard
Aldworth Neville, Richard
Aldworth Neville, Richard
Aldworth Neville, Richard
Aldworth Neville, Richard
Aldworth Neville, Richard
Alumni of Merton College, Oxford
Barons Braybrooke